Siem Reap municipality is an municipality (krong) in Siem Reap province, in north-west Cambodia. According to the 2008 census of Cambodia, it had a population of 230,714. It surrounds the provincial city of Siem Reap.

Administration

References

External links
Siem Reap – The Gate to Angkor (Official Website of the Siem Reap District on www.siemreap-town.gov.kh)

Districts of Cambodia
Geography of Siem Reap province